Friends is a studio album by B.B. King, released by ABC Records in 1974. It was available in stereo under the reference ABCD-825 and in quadraphonic sound under the reference CQD-40022. This album maintains the sentimental mood initiated in the previous album To Know You Is to Love You recorded in the same studio by the same producer.

Track listing
Details are from the original 1974 vinyl LP.
Side A
"Friends" (Dave Crawford, Charles Mann, Will Boulware) – 4:44
"I Got Them Blues" (Dave Crawford, Deryll Inman) – 4:31
"Baby I'm Yours" (Van McCoy) – 3:28
"Up At 5 AM" (Dave Crawford) – 3:15

Side B
"Philadelphia" (Dave Crawford) – 6:03
"When Everything Else Is Gone" (Will Boulware) – 3:08
"My Song" (Dave Crawford, Charles Mann) – 3:57

Personnel
Musical
B.B. King –  vocals, guitar
Dave Crawford & Charles Mann – backgrounds vocals
Deryll Inman – guitar
Norman Harris – guitar
Bobby Eli as Eli Tarkesty – guitar
Roland Chambers – guitar
Dave Crawford – keyboards
Will Boulware – keyboards
Ron Kersey – keyboards
Larry Washington – congas
Vince Montana – vibraphone
Andrew Love – tenor saxophone
Wayne Jackson – trumpet
The Memphis Horns – horns
 Roy Renaldo & Philadelphia Strings – strings
Wade Marcus – arrangement

Technical
Joe Tarsia – engineer (Sigma Sound Studios, Philadelphia)
Mike Lizzio – engineer (Las Vegas Recording Studio, Las Vegas)

References

B.B. King albums
1974 albums
ABC Records albums
Albums recorded at Sigma Sound Studios